Neuenhagen bei Berlin is a municipality in the district Märkisch-Oderland of Brandenburg, Germany. It is situated 19 km east of central Berlin, and was founded around 1230.

History 
Neuenhagen bei Berlin was founded around 1230.

Geography 
Neuenhagen bei Berlin is located east of Berlin, in eastern Germany.

Demography

Mayor
The mayor Jürgen Henze was elected in 2002 with 59.4% of the vote, then reelected in 2010 with 75.2% of the vote. In 2019, he was replaced by Ansgar Scharnke.

Transport 
The village is well connected to Berlin by the S-Bahn line S5 at the station of Neuenhagen.

Partnerships

Twin towns 
  Świebodzin, Poland
  Grünwald, Germany
  Friesoythe, Germany

Notable figures from the town
 Wolfgang Rademann (1934-2016), journalist and TV producer

People associated with the town

 Hans Fallada (1893-1947), author, lived from August 1930 to November 1932 in a house in the settlement of Grüner Winkel in Neuenhagen. Between October 1931 and February 1932 he worked on his novel Little Man, What Now? (novel) there. On the occasion of its 70th anniversary in 1963, Grüner Winkel was renamed Falladaring. A panel at his dwelling house in Falladaring 10 pays tribute to the writer. In his honor, the Hans-Fallada-Grundschule in Neuenhagen was named after him.

References

External links 

Localities in Märkisch-Oderland